Alie Koblo Queen Kabia II (born Alhaji Alie Osman Kabia) was a Sierra Leonean paramount chief. In 1986, he succeeded Bai Koblo Pathbana II and was crowned the 44th Paramount Chief of Marampa Chiefdom. He ruled from his seat at Lunsar, Port Loko District, Sierra Leone.

Sierra Leone Civil War
In 1991, the Sierra Leone Civil War broke out. The National Provisional Ruling Council (NPRC) deposed Chief Koblo and seized Marampa Chiefdom in order to control the iron ore mine.

Chief Koblo was in exile until 2002 when he was reinstated.

Legacy
He was succeeded by his son Osman Ali Kabia assumed the regnal name Bai Koblo Queen Kabia II. He is regarded as one of the richest men in Sierra Leone name="Harvard" />

Further reading
Bai Koblo Pathbana II
Ella Koblo Gulama
Obai
Naimbanna II
Temne

References 

African royalty
Sierra Leonean nobility
Sierra Leonean royalty
Temne people
Living people
Year of birth missing (living people)